Sylvia Braaten (born July 5, 1985) is an American rugby union player. She was named in the Eagles 2014 and 2017 Women's Rugby World Cup squads.

Braaten played basketball, tennis and soccer in high school. She graduated from Marquette University where she discovered rugby. She represented the United States development teams in the under-19s and under-23s. She was signed by BiPro as the brand's fifth professional rugby player.

In 2016 she was part of The Serevi Selects team that played at the Bayleys Coral Coast 7s tournament in Fiji. She is a Certified Strength and Conditioning Specialist.

Braaten was cited for contact with the eye area in the Eagles pool match against England at the 2017 World Cup.

References

External links
USA Rugby Profile

1985 births
Living people
United States women's international rugby union players
American female rugby union players
Female rugby union players
21st-century American women